Paraconotrochus capense is a stony coral in the family Caryophylliidae. The scientific name of this species was first published in 1904 by Gardiner.

References

Caryophylliidae
Scleractinia genera